Mermaid Sapphire is an offshore multipurpose vessel. Built in 2009, the ship is used for mostly research and undersea work. 

She is a purpose-built ABS Classed DP2 ROV and air diving support vessel, designed for operation of dual deepwater work-class ROV's (Quasar Compact or Triton XLX) plus optional inspection-class ROV. The ROV's are installed on a dedicated raised deck level, leaving all back deck space for project equipment. Mermaid Sapphire is also equipped with state-of-the-art subsea inspection data acquisition and data management systems. A 23-tonne knuckleboom crane, and auxiliary 5-tonne crane are also installed.

On March 26, 2012, she carried Deepsea Challenger to the Challenger Deep where the first solo dive to the bottom of the trench was made.

References

2009 ships